The 1957 Virginia 500 was a NASCAR Grand National Series event that was held on May 19, 1957, at Martinsville Speedway in Martinsville, Virginia.

Barney Oldfield made his only NASCAR Cup Series appearance at this event. Months after this race, the Automobile Manufacturers Association decided to legally separate themselves from all forms of automobile racing that was being held in the United States; donating millions of dollars in machinery directly to the drivers.

Background

Martinsville Speedway is one of five short tracks to hold NASCAR races. The track's turns are banked at eleven degrees, while the front stretch, the location of the finish line, is banked at zero degrees. The back stretch also has a zero degree banking.

Race report
It took nearly four hours to race 441 laps worth of stock car automobile racing. While originally scheduled for 500 laps, it was stopped prematurely due to a bad in-race crash. Tom Pistone and Billy Myers would end up getting involved in the collision on lap 441; making Buck Baker the automatic winner. Just before the accident took form, Pistone straightened his car and continued. Myers headed for the wall and then jumped it near where a crowd of folks was standing. The 24-driver starting lineup was made up of drivers who were all born in the United States of America. T.A. Toomes would take up the last-place position due to problems with his gasket on lap 121.

Paul Goldsmith, Tiny Lund and Buck Baker would dominate the laps prior to the accident. The victory of Buck Baker over second-place finisher Curtis Turner would demonstrate the power of the 1957 Chevrolet. Although its real-life counterpart had fuel injection, the NASCAR version had to use a carburetor. Fuel injection did not become legal in what is now known as the Monster Energy NASCAR Cup Series until the 2012 season.

Individual race earnings for this event ranged from the winner's share of $3,170 ($ when adjusted for inflation) to the last-place finisher's share of $125 ($ when adjusted for inflation). A grand total of $12,240 was handed out by NASCAR officials for the explicit purpose of paying off the qualifying drivers ($ when adjusted for inflation). Jess Potter was the only notable crew chief to take part in the race, leading the pit road crew of Brownie King's Chevrolet.

Qualifying

Failed to qualify: Emanuel Zervakis (#11), Bill Champion (#35), Nace Mattingly (#154), Frank Jamison (#80)

*Withdrew.

Timeline
Section reference: 
 Start of race: Paul Goldsmith started the race with the pole position.
 Lap 55: Tiny Lund takes over the lead from Paul Goldsmith.
 Lap 121: Problems with the vehicle's head gasket made T.A. Toomes into the last-place finisher.
 Lap 128: Buck Baker takes over the lead from Tiny Lund.
 Lap 145: Billy Myers takes over the lead from Buck Baker.
 Lap 146: The rear end of Eddie Skinner's vehicle became problematic, forcing him to quit the race.
 Lap 211: Cotton Owens had a terminal crash; causing him to withdraw from the event.
 Lap 233: Buck Baker takes over the lead from Billy Myers.
 Lap 281: Tiny Lund's engine developed problems, forcing him to make an early exit from the race.
 Lap 329: Billy Myers takes over the lead from Buck Baker.
 Lap 377: Johnny Allen noticed that his vehicle's clutch had some issues, causing him to pull over and end his hopes of winning the race.
 Lap 441: Tom Pistone and Billy Myers crashed into each other, jointly ending their chances of winning the race.
 Finish: Buck Baker was declared the winner after starting the event in 14th place.

Finishing order
Section reference:

References

Virginia 500
Virginia 500
NASCAR races at Martinsville Speedway